Sophrosyne (minor planet designation: 134 Sophrosyne) is a large main-belt asteroid that was discovered by German astronomer Robert Luther on 27 September 1873, and was named after the concept of sophrosyne, Plato's term for 'moderation'. Classified as a C-type asteroid, it has an exceedingly dark surface and most probably a primitive carbonaceous composition.

An occultation of a star by 134 Sophrosyne was observed 24 November 1980, in the United States. Timing information from this event allowed a diameter estimate of 110 km to be derived. This provided a good match to the only previous determination in 1989.

References

External links
 
 

Background asteroids
Sophrosyne
Sophrosyne
C-type asteroids (Tholen)
Ch-type asteroids (SMASS)
18730927
Objects observed by stellar occultation